Demba Thiam Ngagne, known as Demba Thiam (born 9 March 1998) is a Senegalese football player. He plays as a goalkeeper for Italian  club Foggia on loan from SPAL.

Club career

SPAL
He started playing for the Under-19 squad of SPAL in the 2016–17 season and made two bench appearances for the senior squad in the Serie B.

Loan to Fano
On 17 July 2017, he was loaned to Serie C club Fano. He made his Serie C debut for Fano on 16 December 2017 in a game against Fermana as a starter. He remained Fano's first-choice goalkeeper for the remainder of the season.

Return to SPAL and loan to Viterbese Castrense
He was the third goalkeeper for the first part of the 2018–19 Serie A season, but did not see any playing time behind Alfred Gomis and Vanja Milinković-Savić. On 9 January 2019, he returned to Serie C on another loan, to Viterbese Castrense.

He came back to SPAL at the end of loan, and he made his Serie A debut in a 1–1 home draw against Torino on 26 July 2020.

In September 2022, Thiam renewed his contract with the club until 2025.

Loan to Foggia
On 31 January 2023, Thiam joined Foggia on loan until the end of the season.

References

External links
 

1998 births
Living people
Senegalese footballers
Association football goalkeepers
S.P.A.L. players
Alma Juventus Fano 1906 players
U.S. Viterbese 1908 players
Calcio Foggia 1920 players
Serie A players
Serie B players
Serie C players
Senegalese expatriate footballers
Expatriate footballers in Italy